Mitja Ilenič (born 26 December 2004) is a Slovenian professional footballer who plays as a right-back for Major League Soccer club New York City FC.

Club career

Early career
Ilenič started his football career in 2011, at the age of six, with Bela Krajina, and then joined Domžale in the summer of 2019. He initially played as a forward, but later moved to the position of right-back when he was still a youngster. He signed his first professional contract with Domžale at the age of sixteen, and made his Slovenian PrvaLiga debut on 22 May 2021 against Aluminij, in the final round of the 2020–21 season.

In October 2022, Ilenič extended his contract with Domžale until 2025. Throughout 2022, he established himself in the club's starting eleven, as he attracted the interest of several foreign clubs, including Sturm Graz, Hellas Verona, Lugano, Sparta Prague and New York City FC.

New York City FC
On 4 January 2023, Ilenič joined Major League Soccer club New York City FC on a permanent deal, signing a contract until 2026, with an option for another year.

International career
Ilenič has represented Slovenia at all youth international levels from under-17 to under-21.

He made his debut for the Slovenian under-21 national team on 25 March 2022, starting and playing the full 90 minutes in a 0–0 draw against Kosovo, a match from the qualification round of the 2023 UEFA European Under-21 Championship. At the age of 17 years, two months and 27 days, he became the second youngest player to ever represent the team, behind only Jan Oblak.

Career statistics

Club

References

External links
 

2004 births
Living people
Slovenian footballers
Slovenia youth international footballers
Slovenia under-21 international footballers
Association football fullbacks
Slovenian PrvaLiga players
Major League Soccer players
NK Bela Krajina players
NK Domžale players
New York City FC players
Slovenian expatriate footballers
Expatriate soccer players in the United States
Slovenian expatriate sportspeople in the United States